Heinrich Göseken (13 April 1612 Hanover – 4 December 1681) was a Baltic-German Lutheran pastor, language enthusiast, occasional poet and translator. He is credited with writing a grammar of the Estonian language as well as a Latin-Estonian-German dictionary.

1631-1634 he studied at Rostock University.

In 1637, he came to Tallinn. He quickly learned the Estonian language and he worked in Western Estonia as a pastor of Kirbla (1638), Risti and Harju-Madise (1639-1641) and Kullamaa (1641-1681). In 1647 he became a dean of Maa-Lääne deanery, and in 1659 an assessor of the Consistory of Tallinn.

He was buried in Kullamaa Church.

Works
In 1641, he wrote the poem: "Heh sel ke Jumlakartus sees" ('He who is in the fear of God'), one of the first poem in Estonian language. In 1656, he published "Neu Ehstnisches Gesangbuch" ('New Estonian Songbook').

In 1660, he published the grammar of the Estonian language: "Manuductio ad Linguam Oesthicam" / "Anführung zue Öhstnischen Sprache" ('Introduction to the Estonian Language'). This grammar book consisted also glossary of Estonian words, being the most extensive Estonian lexicon from the 17th century.

References

Baltic-German people
Estonian Lutheran clergy
1612 births
1681 deaths
Occasional poets